WFON (107.1 FM) is a radio station licensed to Fond du Lac, Wisconsin. The station is owned by RBH Enterprises, Inc.

History
The station was originally owned by Lola Beckmann, and the original WFON studios were in the building that now houses a Day Care.

Programming
The station airs all games of the Green Bay Packers as a member of the Packers Radio Network.

References

External links

FON
Country radio stations in the United States